"Say Goodbye" is a 1999 song recorded by Swedish Eurodance band La Cream and released as the third single from their only album, Sound & Vision. It was successful on the charts in Scandinavia, peaking at number 5 in Finland, number 9 in Norway, number 17 in Denmark and number 21 in Sweden. The song is sung by lead vocalist Tess Mattisson, who also co-wrote it. A music video was made for the song, featuring Mattisson performing inside an ice castle.

Track listing

Charts

References

 

1999 singles
1999 songs
La Cream songs
CNR Music singles
English-language Swedish songs
Songs written by Ari Lehtonen